"Aufstehn!" (German for Get Up) is a song released in 2005 by German band Seeed together with American singer Cee Lo Green. It was the first single of the third album Next! and reached No. 5 in the German Single Charts.

Music video 
The video shows the three singers of Seeed in a boat driving to a concert where the other Seeed members are waiting. The video shows CeeLo Green too. He is standing in front of a house.

Composition 
The song contains lyrics in German and English. Most of the lyrics are in German, however, the intro, the second half of the second verse and the third verse (which is sung by CeeLo Green) are in English. There is also a version which is all English called Rise & Shine.

2005 singles
2005 songs
Warner Records singles
Songs written by Peter Fox (musician)
Songs written by CeeLo Green